Harris Laning (October 18, 1873 – February 2, 1941) was a prominent officer in the United States Navy who eventually rose to the rank of Admiral. He was the uncle of Caleb Barrett Laning, who also achieved that rank.

Naval career
Laning graduated from the United States Naval Academy on 7 June 1895. He served in the Philippine Islands during the Philippine insurrection. His first command was the destroyer , which operated off Veracruz during the 1914 Mexican Campaign. As Chief of Staff to Commander Destroyer Force, Atlantic Fleet in 1919 he supported the first successful transatlantic flight, made by Navy seaplane NC-4 in May.

As a rear admiral, he commanded a battleship division, and he was President of the Naval War College from 1930 to 1933; as a vice admiral, he commanded Cruisers, Scouting Force. As an admiral, he commanded Battle Force, U.S. Fleet, from 1 April 1935 to 20 April 1936. He was Commandant, New York Navy Yard and 3rd Naval District from 20 April 1936 to 1 October 1937.

Laning retired from the Navy on 1 November 1937, then served as Governor of the Naval Home in Philadelphia, Pennsylvania, until his death on 2 February 1941. He was buried in the United States Naval Academy Cemetery.

The Naval War College published his memoirs in 1999.

References

External links
Harris Laning Memoirs - An Admiral's Yarn, 1941 (approximate), MS 529 held by Special Collections & Archives, Nimitz Library at the United States Naval Academy

1873 births
1941 deaths
Burials at the United States Naval Academy Cemetery
Naval War College alumni
Presidents of the Naval War College
Navy Midshipmen athletic directors
United States Navy admirals
United States Naval Academy alumni
People from Petersburg, Illinois
Military personnel from Illinois